Events in the year 1753 in India.

Events
National income - ₹9,033 million
Cession of the Northern Circars to the French.

References

 
India
Years of the 18th century in India